Divalia Fossa  is the largest of the series of parallel Rheasilvian equatorial troughs on the giant asteroid 4 Vesta. It is thought to be a compression fracture resulting from the impact that created Rheasilvia crater. It is one of the longer chasms in the Solar System, and is named after the Roman festival of Divalia.

See also
Saturnalia Fossa, the largest of the Veneneian troughs

References

Extraterrestrial valleys
Geological features on main-belt asteroids
Surface features of 4 Vesta